"Anything" is a song by American singer JoJo from her second studio album, The High Road (2006). It was released as the album's third and final single on March 20, 2007. Written by Beau Dozier, Mischke, and Justin Trugman, the track contains a sample from Toto's 1982 song "Africa", written by David Paich and Jeff Porcaro. The song premiered on March 19, 2007, on The Second JammX Kids All Star Dance Special.

The single served as the second official single from The High Road in European countries and was released in the United Kingdom on May 7, 2007; it began gaining airplay there on March 24, 2007, eventually debuting on BBC Radio 1's playlist under the B-list section. JoJo was in the UK during the first two weeks of May to promote the single; she performed at London's G-A-Y on May 12, and appeared on GMTV on May 8 as part of a series of radio and television interviews. "Anything" remained in the top 40 of the UK Singles Chart for three weeks.

On September 4, 2013, a remix of the song was released featuring American rapper Casey Veggies and Italian musician Francesco.

Critical reception
In About.com's review of The High Road, Bill Lamb called "Anything" a "tasty pop confection."

Music video
The music video for "Anything" was expected to premiere on May 2, 2007. JoJo's UK street team had launched a competition for fans to create their own video for "Anything" that would appear on the enhanced CD when the single was released. It was announced that member "TheHighRoad" won the video mission and his video would be placed on the official website, but fans who wanted to watch it would have to buy the CD because it "unlocks" the video. JoJo posted on her Myspace page that an official video was not completed and that she had asked Blackground Records to facilitate the production process with her and her management. An official video never surfaced.

Track listings
UK CD single
"Anything" – 3:50
"Anything" (WaWa Club Mix) – 7:07
Also includes the winning fan videos for "Anything".

German CD single
"Anything" – 3:50
"Anything" (instrumental) – 3:51
"Get It Poppin'" – 3:41
"Too Little Too Late" (Full Phatt Remix featuring Tah Mac) – 4:24

Credits and personnel
Credits adapted from the liner notes of The High Road.

Recording
 Recorded at Chaos Theory (Encino, California), Sony Studios (New York City, New York) and Sound Moves Studios (Sun Valley, California)
 Mixed at Larrabee Studios (North Hollywood, California)
 Mastered at Oasis Mastering (Burbank, California)

Management
 Published by Like Father Like Son Music adm. by Zomba Songs, Inc. (BMI), mischkemusic (ASCAP), E&J 113 Music/Koala Bear Music/Sony/ATV Publishing (BMI), Hudmar Publishing (BMI), Rising Storm Music (BMI)

Personnel

 JoJo – vocal arrangement, lead vocals, background vocals
 Beau Dozier – production, recording
 Justin Trugman – production
 Dave Russell – mixing
 Michael Woodrum – Pro Tools engineering
 Scott Somerville – engineering assistance
 Gene Grimaldi – mastering

Charts

Release history

References

2006 songs
2007 singles
Blackground Records singles
JoJo (singer) songs
Songs written by Beau Dozier
Songs written by David Paich
Songs written by Jeff Porcaro